Solute carrier family 6, member 18 also known as SLC6A18 is a protein which in humans is encoded by the SLC6A18 gene.

Function 

The SLC6 family of proteins, which includes SLC6A18, acts as specific transporters for neurotransmitters, amino acids, and osmolytes like betaine, taurine, and creatine. SLC6 proteins are sodium cotransporters that derive the energy for solute transport from the electrochemical gradient for sodium ions.

Clinical significance 

Mutations in the SLC6A18 gene are associated with iminoglycinuria.

References

Further reading

Solute carrier family